Dilworth School, often referred to simply as Dilworth, is an independent full boarding school for boys in Auckland, New Zealand. It is the largest full boarding school in both the country and Australasia. Owned and operated by a charitable trust, boys selected to attend do so on scholarships covering education and boarding costs.

History 
Dilworth School was founded under the terms of the will of an Auckland farmer and businessman, Irish born James Dilworth who died in 1894.

He and his wife Isabella had no children of their own and left their wealth to establish a school with a goal of educating sons of people from the top two-thirds of the North Island who had suffered some family misfortune and were unable to afford the education they wanted their children to have.

The school opened in 1906 with eight boys and for the first 21 years offered primary education only. Secondary boys at that time boarded at the school but attended Auckland Grammar School during the day. The original school buildings were Dilworth's old farm homestead and outbuildings. Classrooms and other buildings were added later.

A secondary department was built in 1931. A major expansion started in 1956, the 50th anniversary, with the foundation stone being laid for St Patrick's Chapel. The total roll when that phase of the expansion was completed some five years later, was 300.

The next major jump in numbers was in 1993 when the present Junior Campus was built to accommodate 192 boys. This brought the total roll of both campuses to 510 covering Year 5 to Year 13.

In December 2019, Dilworth presented a vision to create a girls' boarding school to open in 2025.

Dilworth has four houses representing places and counties in Ireland – Tyrone, Dungannon, Donegal and Armagh.

The school also maintains a close relationship with the Royal School Dungannon, James Dilworth's alma mater. Each year, four pupils (called 'Kiwis') go to Dungannon as tutors on scholarship. Likewise, four pupils from Dungannon travel to Auckland to work at Dilworth. This is part of a long-standing exchange programme between the two schools.

Operation Beverly
On 14 September 2020, six men were arrested and charged for historic sex and drug offences alleged to have taken place at the school from the 1970s to the early 2000s. These defendants included the school's former chaplain, Ross Douglas Browne, and two teachers. The police investigation was codenamed "Operation Beverly." On 16 September, a seventh man was charged with indecent assault in 1990 at the Auckland District Court. 

On 10 October 2020, Stuff reported that the Royal Commission of Inquiry into Abuse in Care was looking into historical abuse that had occurred at Dilworth School and other Anglican institutions in New Zealand. Several former students registered to make submissions to the Royal Commission. On 7 December, a former Dilworth pupil testified to the Royal Commission, alleging that students were beaten by staff and senior students and likening the school's environment to the novel Lord of the Flies.

On 11 November 2020, former Assistant Principal Ian Wilson pleaded guilty to two charges involving indecent acts while working at Dilworth. Wilson had earlier been convicted of doing an indecent act with a boy under 12 years in 1996 while serving as Senior School Assistant Principal at MacMurray Boarding House. In late November, it was reported that a former 69-year old Scout Master, whose named was suppressed, facing charges of indecently assaulting a boy in the 1970s had died from cancer.  

On 9 December, name suppression for one of the defendants, Rex McIntosh, was lifted. McIntosh faces three charges of indecent assault. 

On 22 December, Detective Senior Sergeant Geoff Baber reported that an additional 80 victims had been identified and that 33 charges had been filed against five men aged between 68 and 78 as part of Operation Beverly. Baber confirmed that these new charges included allegations of indecency with boys under 16 years old, inducing a boy under 12 to do an indecent act, unlawful sexual connection, and indecent assault. That same day, Ian Wilson pleaded guilty to five charges of indecent assault including against two boys aged under 16 in the 1970s and a boy under 14 in 1992. Two other men facing charges include Ross Browne and Rex McIntosh.

On 10 February 2021, Police identified a former scout master who died before he could face two separate trials for historical sexual offending as Richard Charles Galloway.

On 23 March 2021, former assistant principal Ian Robert Wilson was sentenced by Judge Russell Collins at the Auckland District Court to three years and seven months in prison. Wilson had pleaded guilty to six charges of indecent assault and one of inducing a boy to do an indecent act.

On 14 May 2021, Police confirmed that a third man facing historical sexual abuse charges at Dilworth School had died. As a consequence, any charges the man faces will be withdrawn. Name suppression was subsequently lifted and the man was identified as former school tutor Keith William Dixon.

On 9 June 2021, Graeme Charles Lindsay admitted two counts of indecent assault against two complainants. Lindsay is one of eleven men who have so far been charged.

On 6 October 2021, former school chaplain Ross Douglas Browne pleaded guilty to sexually assaulting 16 boys under his care.

On 31 March 2022, former tutor Jonathan Peter Stephens was sentenced to six months' home detention, having earlier pleaded guilty to two charges of indecently assaulting a boy.

On 1 June 2022, former head of music Leonard Cave was found guilty of sexually abusing 4 boys in his care. Charges relating to a fifth boy were dismissed during the trial.

On 1 July 2022, former housemaster Alister Harlow was sentenced to three years and eight months in prison for sexually abusing students.

On 7 September 2022, name suppression was lifted on Robert Howard Gladwin Wynyard, former teacher and housemaster. He earlier pleaded guilty to 11 indecent assault charges.

Campuses

Dilworth is organised on three separate campuses.

Senior Campus

The Senior Campus is located in Epsom, Auckland and accommodates up to 340 boys from Years 9 – 13. This is the school's flagship campus.

Junior Campus

The Junior Campus was opened in 1993 and is located in Remuera, Auckland. 
The campus accommodates 192 boys from Years 5 – 8.

Rural Campus – Te Haerenga

The new Rural Campus (sometimes called the 'Rural Campus – Te Haerenga (The Journey)') was officially opened in March 2012 after the Trust Board purchased the liquidated hotel and spa, Hotel du Vin. The campus – on 15 ha grounds in Mangatawhiri, south of Auckland – accommodates another 100 students in Year 9

Trust Board
The Dilworth Trust Board is one of New Zealand's largest charities and provides the funding to support the Dilworth School.

The original endowment of 100,000 pounds left in 1894 by James Dilworth in his will has been invested wisely since then and now has grown to a diversified portfolio of investments. The Board still invests predominantly in property, and in particular, in the locality around the School but does hold a number of other investments including shares and bonds, both in New Zealand and overseas. The trust now holds approximately $957 million in assets and cash.

The beneficiaries of this trust are the boys who attend the School. The Board are precluded from assisting any other cause, however worthy it may be, and so this leads to a very focused Board and staff.

A duty of the Board is the granting and withdrawal of scholarships. Whilst staff provide significant input to the process, the final selection remains with the Trustees.

Curriculum
The school curriculum is to provide an academic education by offering subjects that satisfy the seven learning areas of the New Zealand Framework, and thus offers the National Certificate of Educational Achievement (NCEA) Level One, Two & Three.

Sports
The school holds multiple National and Auckland wrestling titles and for a time were the undisputed national powerhouse wrestling school in New Zealand. The school have produced a significant number of New Zealand Junior Representatives and a Junior Olympian since the program's inception in 1997.

Rugby is the most popular code at Dilworth. The school's 1st XV had been among the strongest teams in the Auckland 1B Championship for years, winning 49 out of their 52 games since 2011 and reaching 7 finals since 2000. They were finally crowned 1B Champions in 2012 and won the title again in 2013. In 2015, Dilworth made history by beating Onehunga High School, 12-10, in a 1A Championship promotion match and entered Auckland's top-flight for the first time in 109 years. In their debut 1A season, Dilworth finished 7th out of 12 teams, winning five of their 11 regular season games. In 2016, Dilworth lost much of their starting line-up, however, managed to win three crucial matches against Otahuhu 43-3, Onehunga 19-7 and Kelston Boys' 26-14 to secure an 8th-place finish and survival in the 1A.

The 2017 season was a promising year for the college's 1st XV, with the team opening their account with a 27–13 away win against Liston College. The following weekend, Dilworth produced one of the biggest upsets in 1A history, beating 2016 National Champions and 2017 World Championship silver medallists, Mount Albert Grammar, 20-15. The win brought national attention to the college and took Dilworth to the top of the 1A table for the first time in the school's history. After respectable 2017 and 2018 campaigns avoiding relegation, a noteworthy feat for the league's smallest school with a roll of just over 300, in 2019, Dilworth finished the season in the drop zone. However, in their relegation match, they won emphatically, downing One Tree Hill 95-0 to secure a sixth consecutive berth in 1A rugby for 2020.

The school's basketball program has also enjoyed success and defeated some of the country's powerhouse programs to be finalists in the Auckland Premier league in both 2007 and 2008.

Demographic
As of July 2019, the Ministry of Education reported 68.9% of the school roll was Maori or Pasifika whilst 21.9% of pupils were European and 6.7% of Asian descent.

Headmasters/principals

The school had their first headmaster in 1908.
 C.F. Bourne 1908
 A. Plugge 1909–1914
 N.M.P. Gibson 1914–1945
 B.H. Wakelin 1946–1950
 J. Conolly 1950–1966
 R.G.P. Parr 1967–1979
 M.T. Wilton 1979–1997
 D. J. MacLean 1997–2018
 Dan Reddiex 2019–present

Notable alumni

Sir David Beattie, 14th Governor-General of New Zealand
Mike Moore, 34th Prime Minister of New Zealand and 6th Director-General of the World Trade Organization
Jami-Lee Ross, Member of Parliament for Botany 
Michael Bassett, Cabinet Minister in the Parliament of New Zealand
James Arlidge, Japan international, professional rugby union player
Jarrad Hoeata, All Black and professional rugby union player
Riki Hoeata, professional rugby union player
Fin Hoeata, professional rugby union player
Mark Petrie, film composer
Angus Ta'avao, All Black and professional rugby union player
Toni Pulu, professional rugby union player
Jason Hoyte, actor and radio DJ

David Aloua, professional boxer
Grayson Hart, Scotland international and professional rugby union player
Brendhan Lovegrove, comedian

References

External links
Dilworth School official website
 Sexual abuse claims

Boarding schools in New Zealand
Boys' schools in New Zealand
Educational institutions established in 1906
Primary schools in Auckland
Secondary schools in Auckland
1906 establishments in New Zealand